The Diocese of the Mid-Atlantic is an Anglican Church in North America diocese, encompassing Virginia, Maryland, Washington, D.C. and northeastern North Carolina, with 43 congregations, including 9 church plantings. The diocese was originally organized in 2006 as the Anglican District of Virginia when a group of Virginian congregations withdrew from the Episcopal Church. It achieved diocesan status on June 21, 2011.

History

Founding congregations
The Anglican District of Virginia was organized on December 17, 2006, by nine congregations that broke away from the Episcopal Diocese of Virginia. These congregations voted overwhelmingly to leave the Episcopal Church and formed the Anglican District of Virginia as part of the Convocation of Anglicans in North America (CANA), a ministry to Nigerian Anglicans living in North America that had also become an agent of Anglican realignment. The district was led by Martyn Minns, the Missionary Bishop of CANA.

The founding congregations were:

Church of the Epiphany, Herndon, Virginia
Truro Church, Fairfax
The Falls Church (Anglican), Falls Church
St Margaret’s Church, Woodbridge, VA
Church of the Apostles, Fairfax, VA
Church of the Word, Gainesville, VA
St Stephens (Anglican), Heathsville, VA
Potomac Falls (Anglican), Potomac Falls, VA
Christ the Redeemer (Anglican), Centreville, VA

Growth
A tenth congregation that had broken from the Episcopal Diocese of Southern Virginia in October 2006, Church of the Messiah in Chesapeake, also later joined the district.

With the creation of the Anglican Church in North America in 2009, the Anglican District became a part of the new province while it continued to maintain its relationship with CANA. In May 2011, the district held a constitutional convention in Herndon, Virginia, where it voted to apply for formal diocesan status within ACNA and elected John Guernsey, USA Bishop of the Ugandan Diocese of North Kigezi and former rector of All Saints Church in Dale City, Virginia, as its first bishop. The Anglican Church's provincial council approved its admission as a diocese on June 21. Guernsey took office on September 10, 2011.

Church of the Word retained its property and rejoined DOMA in April 2016. In 2021, the historic Christ Church in Accokeek, Maryland, disaffiliated from the Episcopal Diocese of Washington and joined DOMA while retaining its property.

On October 15, 2022, Christopher Warner was selected as bishop-elect to succeed Guernsey. He was consecrated and invested in February 2023.

Bishops
 John Guernsey (2011–2023)
 Christopher Warner (2023–present)

References

External links
Anglican Diocese of the Mid-Atlantic Official Website

Dioceses of the Anglican Church in North America
Anglican dioceses established in the 21st century
Anglican realignment dioceses